Obocell was a brand name drug by Irwin, Neisler & Co. containing 5mg dextroamphetamine phosphate and 25mg methapyrilene; an enantiopure dibasic central nervous system (CNS) stimulant combined with a  first generation H1-antihistamine in the same tablet. It was marketed during the 1950s and 1960s as an  anti-obesity/weight loss medication.

Medical uses 
Obocell was indicated for the treatment of obesity, with the therapeutic anorectic effect being achieved by consuming the medication 30 to 60 minutes prior to each meal. The manufacturer recommended dosage was 1 or 2 tablets to be taken with a full glass of water three times daily. Nicel, the company's brand name formulation of high-viscosity methylcellulose, was an additional third active ingredient present within the Obocell-TF formulation as 160mg Nicel per tablet.

Advertising 

In an ad published by the New York Academy of Medicine which targeted physicians, Obocell was touted as "helping the obese patient adhere to your diet chart by curbing gnawing appetite and suppressing bulk hunger during and between meals". It was advertised to physicians with portly figurines called "Mr. Obocell" and "Mrs. Obocell."

References

Antiobesity drugs
Stimulants
Phenethylamines